The 1921 Tour de France was the 15th edition of Tour de France, one of cycling's Grand Tours. The Tour began in Paris with a flat stage on 26 June, and Stage 8 occurred on 10 July with a flat stage to Toulon. The race finished in Paris on 24 July.

Stage 1
26 June 1921 — Paris to Le Havre,

Stage 2
28 June 1921 — Le Havre to Cherbourg-en-Cotentin,

Stage 3
30 June 1921 — Cherbourg-en-Cotentin to Brest,

Stage 4
2 July 1921 — Brest to Les Sables-d'Olonne,

Stage 5
4 July 1921 — Les Sables-d'Olonne to Bayonne,

Stage 6
6 July 1921 — Bayonne to Luchon,

Stage 7
8 July 1921 — Luchon to Perpignan,

Stage 8
10 July 1921 — Perpignan to Toulon,

References

1921 Tour de France
Tour de France stages